Toby Williams is a British actor, writer and award-winning stand-up comedian performing both as himself and Dr George Ryegold. He is known for a number of appearances on television including regular or recurring roles on Vanity Fair, Porters and Sex Education.

Career 
His stand-up accolades include Dave's 'Top 10 Funniest Jokes of the Fringe' 2012, winner of 'Best Show' at The Leicester Comedy Festival 2011, winner of a Three Weeks Editors' Award at the Edinburgh Festival Fringe 2011 (for 'The Fudge Shop') and a nomination for 'The Malcolm Hardee Award for Comic Originality' for his debut Edinburgh 2009 show as George Ryegold, 'Trample The Weak, Hurdle The Dead'.

He appears in the movies High-Rise, Paddington and The Drowning of Arthur Braxton. He has appeared in Holby City (BBC 1), Morgana Robinson's The Agency (BBC 2) and in the sitcoms Bull (UKTV GOLD), Raised By Wolves (Channel 4), Trying Again (Sky Living), Carters Get Rich (Sky 1) and Benidorm (ITV). He appears in Island Queen – nominated for the BAFTA Award for Best Short Film – and is known as the voice of Rumple the Rhino in Iconicles (CBeebies). He also appears in the popular Specsavers TV commercial as the short-sighted vet.

In 2019 he appeared as Tim in the second episode of Sex Education (Netflix), reprising the role in the second series in 2020. 

Also in 2019 he appeared as 'Doctor' Davey Scholes in an episode of Doctors (BBC1), and Colin in Eastenders (BBC1), a man delivering a gazebo to Jean Slater (Gillian Wright) at the caravan park where she is staying, who is convinced by Stacey Fowler (Lacey Turner) and Martin Fowler (James Bye) to let their daughter Lily Fowler (Aine Garvey) hide in the gazebo box to gain entry to Jean's caravan. He also reprised the role of Terry Grimm in Series 2 of Porters (Dave) whom he originally portrayed in Series 1.

Williams appeared as a panellist on the 2016 pilot episode of ITV show Sorry, I Didn't Know, presented by Jimmy Akingbola, returning for the series in October 2020.

Filmography

References

External links 
 
 Toby Williams at Yakety Yak

Living people
British stand-up comedians
British male film actors
British male television actors
British male stage actors
21st-century British male actors
Comedians from Hampshire
Year of birth missing (living people)